Lokkhi Chele is a 2022 Indian Bengali language drama film written and directed by Kaushik Ganguly. The film is produced by Nandita Roy and Shiboprosad Mukherjee under the banner of Windows Production. The film stars Ujaan Ganguly as the protagonist.

Synopsis 
The plot revolves around Amir Hussain, Shibnath Dutta and Gayatri Chatterjee, three young doctors who stood against the socio-religious dogmas and superstitions prevalent in the rural areas and is hell bent on bringing in a sea of changes among the villagers.

Cast 
 Ujaan Ganguly as Amir Hussain 
 Ritwika Pal as Gayatri Chatterjee 
 Purab Seal Acharya as Shibnath Dutta
 Indrasish Roy as Rajat Narayan Ray
 Pradip Bhattacharya as Haren Khuro
 Ambarish Bhattacharya as Joy Mitra
 Churni Ganguly as Dr. Mitali Sen
 Babul Supriyo as Rwitobroto Sen
 Manosree Biswas as Gopa
 Joydip Mukherjee as Anwar Hussain, Amir's father

Soundtrack

Release 
The film was released theatrically on 26 August 2022.

Reception 
The film received critical acclaim. In OTTplay, Shamayita Chakraborty wrote, "Lokhi Chele is a must-watch. Besides the issue that the film deals with, its treatment, violence, disturbance and subtle non-linear storytelling are something that we have not seen in Bengali films for a while. There are problems in the film and yet we must encourage our friends, family members and colleagues to watch it just for the sake of the issue it deals with. Lokkhi Chele is an unsettling film that should be watched and rewatched until we see an end to the dark reality of superstitions in India".
Aritra Banerjee from Film Companion stated "It is an entertaining film, it is a very engaging film. At the same time, it is a very honest film", praising the film's screenplay, acting performances, cinematography and editing. 
The Indian Express gave a mixed review: "It tries to critique religious dogmatism but its ambitions are marred because of an almost amateurish screenplay".

References

External links 
 

Bengali-language Indian films
Indian drama films
Films postponed due to the COVID-19 pandemic
2022 drama films
2022 films